National Route 292 is a national highway of Japan connecting Naganohara, Gunma and Myōkō, Niigata in Japan, with a total length of .

See also

References

National highways in Japan
Roads in Gunma Prefecture
Roads in Nagano Prefecture
Roads in Niigata Prefecture